William "the Younger" Peverel ( or  – after 1155) was the son of William Peverel. He lived in Nottingham, England.

He married Avicia de Lancaster (1088 – ) in La Marche, Normandy, France. She was possibly the daughter of William de Lancaster I and Countess Gundred de Warenne, daughter of William de Warenne, 2nd Earl of Surrey. In 1114, she bore a daughter, Margaret Peverel. Another member of his family, Maude Peverel (a sister or daughter) was, by 1120, the first wife of Robert fitz Martin.

William inherited the Honour of Peverel.

He was a principal supporter of King Stephen, and a commander in the Battle of the Standard. He was captured at the Battle of Lincoln in 1141.

King Henry II dispossessed William of the Honour in 1153, for conspiring to poison Ranulf de Gernon, although historians speculate that the King wished to punish him for his "wickedness and treason" in supporting King Stephen. The Earl died before he took possession of the Honour, and it stayed in the Crown for about a half century.

References

Further reading

1155 deaths
12th-century English people
Year of birth uncertain
People of The Anarchy